Floodwall, an installation by Jana Napoli, is composed of drawers salvaged in the aftermath of Hurricane Katrina in New Orleans in 2005.

In 2005, two months after Hurricane Katrina and the collapse of the levee system, Napoli collected debris from the storm. She retrieved 750 drawers from dressers, kitchen cabinets, desks and bureaus. The empty drawers were cleaned, and the addresses of the houses were marked on the back. Napoli stated that "Floodwall was made in an attempt to give voice to the silence of a city in ruin and a people in diaspora."

The  contents  that remained were then photographed. The resulting  objects along with the recorded oral histories make up the installation. Floodwall poses the question to its onlookers: what price are we willing to pay for the protection of the intimacy of our households?

Construction

From Floodwall'''s first construction in 2007, Napoli has installed it in multiple ways. Sometimes installed as a monumental wall, Floodwall stands eight feet tall and stretches as long as 192 feet.Floodwall has been displayed on the floor like tombstones in a cemetery, sometimes functioning as a memorial and other times a room that envelops the spectator. The installation has also been used as a setting for collaborative theater performances involving singing and dance.

Oral HistoryDrawers and Personal Stories: part of the exhibition is a collection of recorded oral histories from the original drawer owners. This gathering of these oral histories is an ongoing project that assembles audio recordings—interviews. A selection of these recordings may be heard here:
The list of  drawer owners may be viewed here:

List of installations

• New York, New York- January 4 – February 9, 2007.
World Financial Center

• Baton Rouge, Louisiana- July 13 – October 13, 2007.
Louisiana State Museum

• Austin, Texas- February 16 – May 25, 2008
Blanton Art Museum

• Cincinnati, Ohio- August 28 – September 14, 2008.
Clifton  Cultural Arts Center

• New Orleans, Louisiana- November 1, 2008 – January 18, 2009.
On Piety, Prospect 1 Biennial

• New Orleans, Louisiana- April 17, 2009 – July 12, 2009.
Previously On Piety, an auxiliary exhibition of Prospect One
Contemporary Arts Center 

• Bremerhaven, Germany- February 2, 2009 - May 10, 2009.
"Nach der Flut die Flucht- New Orleans Die Ausgewanderte Stadt/The Flight After the Flood- New Orleans The City Left Behind."
Deutsches Auswandererhaus/German Emigration Center

• Wroclaw, Poland- July 14, 2010 – September 5, 2010.
National Museum, Wrocław

• Houston, Texas- September 10 - October 23, 2010.Understanding Water and Before (During) After, Photographers Respond to Katrina,Diverse Works Art Space

• Berlin, Germany- September 10, 2010 – October 15, 2010. On Board of the Kurier Ship"
A video of the exhibition may be found here: 

• New Orleans, LA- December 3, 2011.
Floodwall Cremation

Cremation

On December 3, 2011, all 700+ drawers were cremated on the banks of the Mississippi River at Algiers Point in New Orleans, LA.

Floating on Fire 
Since the December 3, 2011 cremation of the Floodwall installation, Floodwall and its cremation lives on in an art documentary entitled, Floating on Fire, by the studio  ManifiestaFilms out of Wroclaw, Poland and produced by ManifiestaFilms and Floodwall artist, Jana Napoli.  Floating on Fire made its screening debut at the 2015 New Orleans Film Festival.  

The film will be shown next in the New Horizons International Film Festival in Wroclaw, Poland.

References

External links

Floodwall Website
Partner project, DrawerSpeaks, website
Artist, Jana Napoli's, webpage.
Ya/Ya, Inc., internationally recognized non-profit youth arts program founded by artist, Jana Napoli in 1988.
Floodwall interview on NPR Berlin. Berlin, Germany.  Sept 20, 2010.
Floodwall in the New York Times. Jan 5, 2007.
Floodwall in the Louisiana Association of Museums catalogue.  Summer 2009.
Floodwall cited in the book, Curricular Conversations: Play is the (Missing) Thing by Margaret Macintyre Latta.

International responses to Hurricane Katrina
Grief
Installation art works
Hurricane Katrina disaster relief